The A-26 Invader (B-26 between 1948–1965) was a twin-engined light attack bomber, built by the Douglas Aircraft Co. during World War II, that also saw service during several other conflicts in the post-war era of the latter 20th century.

On display

These complete examples of the A-26 Invader have been preserved or restored, and are on display at museums or at military bases, or are active aircraft potentially viewable at air events.

Status Codes:

D = Display
A = Airworthy
S = Stored
R = Under restoration

Notes

References 
Federal Aviation Administration. 2014. United States Civil Aircraft Register (USCAR)

(CD-ROM)

External links
Douglas B-26K (A-26) Counter Invader – National Museum of the United States Air Force
Warbird Registry: A-26 Registry http://www.warbirdregistry.org/a26registry/a26registry.html

A-26 survivors
Douglas A-26 Invaders
Douglas A-26 Invader